No Talking, Just Head is an album released in 1996 by the Heads, a band composed of Jerry Harrison, Tina Weymouth, and Chris Frantz of Talking Heads, joined by a variety of guest singers. Its name may be seen as an allusion to the fact that Talking Heads' former vocalist, David Byrne, is the only member not involved.

This was, at the time, intended to turn into a full-time project, with further studio albums and tour. Furthermore, a live CD/video of the first tour was planned, featuring performances of songs originally recorded by Talking Heads reinterpreted by the album's guest artists. However, Byrne sued the group, asserting that their name and presentation was too evocative of Talking Heads. The suit was settled out of court and the album was released. The band toured the US in the fall of 1996 with Johnette Napolitano serving as the primary lead vocalist.

"Damage I've Done" and "Don't Take My Kindness for Weakness" were released as singles with several remixes by Moby, Lunatic Calm and others. Both were promoted with music videos.

The album received negative reviews.

Track listing

Personnel

The Heads
 Chris Frantz – drums, loops
 Jerry Harrison – keyboards
 Tina Weymouth – bass guitar, keyboard bass, backing vocals, cover artwork and design

Additional musicians
Sly Dunbar – loops on "Punk Lolita"
 Abdou M'Boup – percussion
 Blast Murray – guitar
 Lenny Pickett – saxophone, flute on "The King Is Gone"
Johnette Napolitano – buzz guitar on "Damage I've Done", background vocals on "Blue Blue Moon"
Maria McKee – Guitar and synthesizer on "No Big Bang"
Paul "Kermit" Leverage – additional vocals on "Don't Take My Kindness for Weakness"
Andy Partridge – whistling on "Papersnow"

References

1996 debut albums
Albums produced by Jerry Harrison
MCA Records albums
The Heads (American band) albums
Collaborative albums